Sungjibaegam is a locality in Paegam County, Ryanggang Province in North Korea. 
It is associated with Paegam-rodongjagu (Paegam Workers' District). It is about 35 km south of Paegam Town, also part of the county.

It is served by Paegam Chongnyon Station (trains).
Punggye-ri Nuclear Test Site for the North Korean nuclear test on 12 February 2013 was
located 23km ENE of Sungjibaegam.

References 

Ryanggang
Former populated places in North Korea